Khasi Katha– A Goat Saga is a 2013 Bengali film. The film is directed by Judhajit Sarkar and produced by Star Fine Movies. The film was scheduled to be released in March 2013. The film shows a talkative goat, about to be slaughtered telling a story of a woman boxer of Kolkata to the butcher.

Naseeruddin Shah plays the character of butcher and Anindita Bose plays the character of woman boxer.

Plot 
The film begins with a scene where a butcher is going to slaughter a goat. The goat becomes talkative and pleads with the butcher for life and promises to tell a story in return. The butcher is surprised but agrees. The goat now tells the butcher the story of a female boxer Salma who belongs to a lower-middle-class family and dreams to become a boxer.

Cast 
 Naseeruddin Shah as the butcher
 Anindita Bose as Salma (boxer)
 Subhasish Mukherjee
 Prasun Gayen
 Silajit Majumder 
 Biswanath Basu
 Anindya Bandyopadhyay
 Mir Afsar Ali
 Joy Badlani
 Sanjoy Sinharoy

Production 
Judhajit Sarkar made a documentary film on woman boxers of Kolkata few years back. At that time he felt this subject would  be interesting to make a full-length film. Sarkar explained, boxing is a game where the player accepts physical punishment voluntarily and it becomes more thrilling when a woman does it.

Casting 

Naseeruddin Shah plays the role of the butcher. Sarkar worked with Shah in Vidhu Vinod Chopra’s film Sazaaye Maut where Sarkar worked as an assistant. After collecting money for the film Sarkar contacted Shah and asked if he wanted to play the character. Shah agreed to act in the film immediately upon learning about the character he was offered.

Anindita Bose plays the character of woman boxer. Bose and another actor Daminee took boxing training for a month to prepare themselves for their characters.

See also 
 Nobel Chor, a 2012 Bengali-language film

References 

2013 films
Bengali-language Indian films
2010s Bengali-language films